John Forbes Thompson (May 20, 1920 – August 12, 1965) was a U.S. politician who was a member of the Massachusetts House of Representatives from 1949–1964. He served as the House Majority Leader from 1955–1957 and Speaker of the House from 1958 to 1964.

Thompson continued to hold the office of speaker in 1964 following a bribery indictment, but did not preside during a debate on a motion to declare the office vacant, which was defeated on May 11, 1964. Nor did he preside from the rostrum for the remainder of the annual session that ended in the early morning of July 4, 1964. He was reelected as State Representative in November, 1964.  He was not a candidate for Speaker when the House convened in 1965. He died before the bribery case was resolved.

John F. Thompson Hall, a center for social and behavioral science classrooms and offices at the University of Massachusetts Amherst, is named after him.

See also
 Massachusetts legislature: 1949–1950, 1953–1954, 1955–1956, 1957–1958, 1959–1960, 1961–1962, 1963–1964
 Massachusetts House of Representatives' 2nd Hampden district

References 

1920 births
1965 deaths
Boston College Law School alumni
Boston University alumni
People from Ludlow, Massachusetts
Speakers of the Massachusetts House of Representatives
Democratic Party members of the Massachusetts House of Representatives
20th-century American politicians